Advance Provisioning Allowance (APA) is an advance payment required to be made to fund estimated boarding costs of the charter price used to cover the costs of yacht preparation, requested supplies, port, mooring and other legal charges and fees, diesel and fuel, communications, crew gratuities, extras and depends on guest particular request for services, itinerary, food, beverages etc.

In case APA is not entirely used at the end of the cruise / sail, the remaining part is returned to the person chartering a yacht. In case the spending exceeds the APA, guests can be asked to pay the additional part.

References

Yachting